Rigel was a large black Newfoundland dog who was said to have saved some of the survivors of the sinking of the RMS Titanic. One account of the story was published in the New York Herald, April 21, 1912, the other was the book Sinking of the Titanic and Great sea disasters by Logan Marshall, published in 1912. However, although the story has been widely reproduced, there is doubt about whether the dog actually existed.

Story
Murdoch died in the sinking, but Rigel swam away, and stayed close to one of the lifeboats (Boat #4, in some accounts). When  arrived on the scene looking for survivors, Rigel began to bark. The lifeboat had drifted under the bows of the Carpathia, and was at risk of being run down, but the people in the boat were too exhausted to make themselves heard. Rigel's barks alerted Captain Arthur Rostron, who ordered the engines stopped and began the search for survivors. Everyone in the lifeboat was saved, and Rigel was pulled from the icy water after three hours, unaffected by the experience. The dog was too large to be pulled from the water by hand, but a seaman aboard the Carpathia, Jonas Briggs, managed to get a canvas sling under its belly, with which it was hauled aboard. 

This story, however, has been the subject of controversy and skepticism. The above narrative has typically been credited to Rigel's inventive savior, Jonas Briggs, who later adopted the dog. But researchers have raised doubts about his role in the story. They note that there is no record of a "Jonas Briggs" working aboard the Carpathia at the time. Moreover, none of the survivors in lifeboat number four mentioned the dog in their accounts of their rescue. The Carpathia had also stopped her engines long before picking up Lifeboat 4, which rowed towards her rather than the other way around. Also, contrary to the legend (which claims that conditions were foggy), witness testimony and photographic evidence show that conditions were perfectly clear the morning after the disaster. So the story is very likely untrue.

Another theory, most notably advocated by Stanley Coren, claims that the Carpathias Master at Arms, John Brown, adopted Rigel, while "Brigg" was the name of a passenger aboard one of the lifeboats (however, there was no Titanic survivor of that name either). In this telling, John Brown retired soon after the incident and took the Newfoundland with him to his home in rural Scotland. There, the dog lived to an old age. The source for this is a 1962 interview that Brown's granddaughter gave for BBC radio. However, while the story has unmistakable similarities, she did not directly connect it to the legend, saying that her grandfather never determined the dog's name or owner. The story remains anecdotal, as no verified Titanic or Carpathia passengers or crew mention the dog in their own accounts. 

The website WilliamMurdoch.net, dedicated to the life of Murdoch, rejected the story as a myth on 4 key points: 1) There is no evidence that William Murdoch nor his wife Ada had a dog, let alone a black Newfoundland. Richard Edkins, who runs the website Murdoch of the Titanic (also dedicated to Murdoch's life) and is affiliated with Murdoch's surviving relatives, dismissed the story as "arrant rubbish", saying neither Murdoch nor Ada owned a dog. 2) There is no evidence that a "Jonas Briggs" was ever a crew member aboard the Carpathia. 3) The account, if true, would have been witnessed by dozens of people in boat no.4 and aboard the Carpathia, but there is no evidence that anyone else, including Rostron, ever reported such a story. And 4) If true, the crew of the Carpathia had been under obligation to return the dog to Murdoch's widow Ada rather than simply assuming they could adopt it, something which Second Officer Lightoller, as a personal friend of the Murdoch's, would have ensured. None of the surviving officers mention such a dog being on board, which would surely have been notable, and they make no mention of it in a letter they sent to Ada shortly after the disaster to express their condolences. The webmaster speculated that the story was invented because newspapers in the days after the disaster were offering money for  Titanic stories, that it spread because it provided a more hopeful tale at a time when troubling rumors of Murdoch's demise were circulating, and that it has endured due to its popularity among dog lovers. They write "the story seems to have struck a chord with many who overlook the fact that it has no basis in fact."

See also
 List of individual dogs

Notes and references
Citations

Sources

Further reading

See also
 Animals aboard the RMS Titanic
 Legends and myths regarding RMS Titanic
 List of fictional dogs

External links 
Did Murdoch have a dog called Rigel?
Individual dogs
RMS Titanic